This is a list of vice admirals in the Royal Danish Navy. The rank of vice admiral is the second highest rank currently achievable by serving officers. It ranks above counter admiral and below admiral.

Persons listed are shown with the rank of vice admiral. Those who only held the rank of vice admiral on an acting basis are not shown.

List of vice admirals

1600

1700

1800

1900

See also
 Admiral (Denmark)
 List of Danish full admirals

References
Citations

Bibliography
 
 
 

Danish vice admirals